Statistics of Empress's Cup in the 1981 season.

Overview
It was contested by 8 teams, and Shimizudaihachi SC won the championship.

Results

Quarterfinals
FC Jinnan 2-0 Nagoya LFC
FC PAF 2-1 Nishiyama High School
Takatsuki FC 3-0 Yowa Ladies
Kobe FC 0-5 Shimizudaihachi SC

Semifinals
FC Jinnan 0-0 (pen 1–2) FC PAF
Takatsuki FC 0-3 Shimizudaihachi SC

Final
FC PAF 0-6 Shimizudaihachi SC
Shimizudaihachi SC won the championship.

References

Empress's Cup
1981 in Japanese women's football